Scabby may refer to:

People
 William Cragh, Welsh medieval warrior, also known as "William the Scabby".
 Cathal Carragh Ua Conchobair, King of Connacht from 1189 to 1202, who was nicknamed "scabby".
 Amlaíb Cenncairech, a Norse ruler whose name is often translated into "scabby head".
 Peibio Clafrog, whose name translates as "scabby" or "leprous".

Places 
 Scabby Range Nature Reserve, a nature reserve in Australia
 Mount Scabby, a mountain in Australia

Other 
 A name given to Inflatable rats, which are frequently used at trade union protests and strikes.
 Orf (disease), colloquially known as "scabby mouth".
 A UK variant of Old maid (card game) called "scabby queen".